Holly Brown-Borg is an American biologist and biogerontologist best known for her research on the regulation of lifespan by growth hormone. She is the Chester Fritz Distinguished Professor of Pharmacology, Physiology & Therapeutics at the University of North Dakota School of Medicine and Health Sciences.

Education and training 
Brown-Borg attended the University of Nebraska-Lincoln as an undergraduate, receiving a B.S. in Agriculture and an M.S. in Animal Science. She performed her Ph.D. research at North Carolina State University, followed by post-doctoral research at the USDA Meat Animal Research Center and Southern Illinois University.

Academic career 
Brown-Borg joined the faculty of the University of North Dakota School of Medicine and Health Sciences in the Department of Pharmacology, Physiology & Therapeutics as an Assistant Professor in 1995 and was tenured as Associate Professor in 2002. In 2010, Brown-Borg was selected as a Chester Fritz Distinguished Professor, an endowed professorship established by Chester Fritz. She has received several awards for her work, including an Ellison Medical Foundation Senior Scholar Award and the Glenn Award for Research in Biological Mechanisms of Aging. Her contributions to the field of the biology of aging were recognized in 2013 by receipt of the Denham Harman Lifetime Achievement Research Award from the American Aging Association, the society's highest honor.

Brown-Borg is a leader in the field of aging. In 2010 served as president of the American Aging Association; she also has served as Chair of Biological Sciences section of Gerontological Society of America. Her contribution to aging and these societies have been recognized by her election as a Fellow of the Gerontological Society of America in 2006 and a Fellow of the American Aging Association in 2016.

In postdoctoral research completed by Brown-Borg in Andrzej Bartke's laboratory, Brown-Borg demonstrated that the Ames Dwarf mouse had a significant increase in lifespan.  Brown-Borg's work has also linked growth hormone signaling to oxidative stress and methionine metabolism, and highlighted the role of growth hormone in the pro-longevity effects of methionine restriction.

Honors and awards 
 2016 Elected Fellow of the American Aging Association
 2013 American Aging Association Lifetime Achievement Denham Harman Research Award
 2014 Chair, AFAR Research Grant for Junior Faculty Selection Committee
 2013 Chair, AFAR Research Committee
 2011 Chair of the Ellison/Postdoctoral Fellows Selection Committee
 2011 Glenn Award for Research in Biological Mechanisms of Aging
 2010-2011 President of the American Aging Association
 2010 Appointed UND Chester Fritz Distinguished Professor 
 2009-2010 Chair of Biological Sciences section of Gerontological Society of America 
 2009 Senior Scholar Award, The Ellison Medical Foundation 
 2008 Glenn Award for Research in Biological Mechanisms of Aging
 2006 Elected Fellow of the Gerontological Society of America

Professional societies 
 American Aging Association
 Gerontological Society of America

References

External links 
 Brown-Borg's faculty profile at UND
 

Year of birth missing (living people)
Living people
21st-century American biologists
Biogerontologists
University of Nebraska–Lincoln alumni
North Carolina State University alumni
University of North Dakota faculty